De Moraes is a lunar impact crater that is located in the northern part of the Moon's far side. It lies to the northeast of the larger crater Bridgman, and southwest of van Rhijn.

This is a worn crater feature with features that have been softened and rounded from a long history of minor impacts. Small but notable craters overlay the rim and inner walls on the northeast and northwest sides, and there is a slanting gouge in the eastern rim. The interior floor is nearly featureless, being marked only by a few tiny craterlets.

Satellite craters
By convention these features are identified on lunar maps by placing the letter on the side of the crater midpoint that is closest to De Moraes.

References

 
 
 
 
 
 
 
 
 
 
 
 

Impact craters on the Moon